Edward John Garcia (born November 24, 1928) is an inactive Senior United States district judge of the United States District Court for the Eastern District of California.

Education and career

Garcia was born on November 24, 1928, in Sacramento, California. Garcia was in the United States Army Air Forces in the aftermath of World War II, from 1946 to 1949. He received an Associate of Arts degree from Sacramento City College in 1951 and a Bachelor of Laws from McGeorge School of Law at the University of the Pacific in 1958. He was a deputy district attorney of Sacramento County, California from 1959 to 1972, serving as a supervisor in that office from 1964 to 1969, and chief of that office from 1969 to 1972. He was a judge on the Sacramento Municipal Court, California from 1972 to 1984.

Federal judicial service

On February 16, 1984, Garcia was nominated by President Ronald Reagan to a seat on the United States District Court for the Eastern District of California vacated by Judge Philip Charles Wilkins. Garcia was confirmed by the United States Senate on March 13, 1984, and received his commission on March 14, 1984. He assumed senior status on November 24, 1996. He retired into inactive senior status on November 30, 2012, meaning that while he remains a federal judge, he no longer hears cases or participates in the business of the court.

See also
List of Hispanic/Latino American jurists

References

Sources
 

1928 births
Living people
Hispanic and Latino American judges
California state court judges
Judges of the United States District Court for the Eastern District of California
United States district court judges appointed by Ronald Reagan
20th-century American judges
Sacramento City College alumni
McGeorge School of Law alumni
United States Army Air Forces soldiers
21st-century American judges